A presidential library, presidential center, or presidential museum is a facility either created in honor of a former president and containing their papers, or affiliated with a country's presidency.

In the United States 

 The presidential library system, a network of 15 government-run libraries, plus a number of privately-run ones
 Jefferson Davis Presidential Library and Museum in Biloxi, Mississippi, a privately-owned library named after Jefferson Davis, president of the secessionist Confederate States
 Presidential Museum and Leadership Library in Odessa, Texas, about presidents in general
 World's Smallest Presidential Library in Atchison County, Kansas, a museum exhibit about David Rice Atchison, who some have claimed was Acting President of the United States for one day

In other countries 

  in Baku, Azerbaijan, established in 2003
  in Minsk, Belarus, a research library
  in Tbilisi, Georgia, named after former president Mikheil Saakashvili
 South Korea:
  in Seoul, named after former president Kim Dae-jung
  in Gumi, named after former president Park Chung-hee
 Vicente Fox Center of Studies, Library and Museum in San Cristóbal, Guanajuato, Mexico, named after former president Vicente Fox
 Olusegun Obasanjo Presidential Library in Abeokuta, Ogun State, Nigeria, named after former president Chief Olusegun Obasanjo
 Boris Yeltsin Presidential Library in Saint Petersburg, Russia, named after Boris Yeltsin, first president of the Russian Federation
 J. R. Jayewardene Centre in Colombo, Sri Lanka, named after Junius Richard Jayewardene, first executive president of Sri Lanka
 Taiwan (Republic of China):
  in Taipei, named after former president Chiang Ching-kuo
 Presidential and Vice-Presidential Artifacts Museum in Taipei, with archives from various presidents and vice presidents of the country
 Presidential Library in Ankara, Turkey, the largest library in the country

References